Mladen Erjavec (born 8 April 1970) is a Croatian former professional basketball player, and now a coach.

Erjavec played on the point guard position for Slovenian, Croatian, Bosnian-Herzegovinian, Polish, French, Russian and Cypriot clubs.

As an assistant coach with the Croatian national basketball team he participated in the 2009 Mediterranean Games, 2010 World Championship, 2011 European Championship and 2013 European Championship.

In July 2014 he became the coach of KK Jolly JBŠ but was replaced before the start of the season due to poor results in pre-season matches.

References

Living people
1970 births
ABA League players
BC Avtodor Saratov players
Croatian basketball coaches
Croatian expatriate basketball people in France
Croatian men's basketball players
Czarni Słupsk players
Croatian expatriate basketball people in Russia
HKK Široki players
Keravnos B.C. players
KK Šibenik players
KK Split coaches
KK Split players
KK Zadar players
KK Zagreb players
Orléans Loiret Basket players
Point guards
KK Dubrava players